Naptown is a nickname and may refer to:

 Annapolis, Maryland
 Indianapolis, Indiana
 Kannapolis, North Carolina